John Robert Gray (May 14, 1925 – June 16, 1996) was an American politician who served as a member of the Wisconsin State Assembly.

Life and career
Gray was born in May 1925 in Bryant, Wisconsin. During World War II, he served in the United States Army.

He was elected to the Assembly in 1958. From 1955 to 1959, he was Sheriff of Langlade County, Wisconsin. He was a Democrat.

Gray died from cancer in Livingston, Wisconsin on June 16, 1996, at the age of 71.

References

External links
The Political Graveyard
Wisconsin Historical Society

1925 births
1996 deaths
Democratic Party members of the Wisconsin State Assembly
Military personnel from Wisconsin
People from Langlade County, Wisconsin
United States Army personnel of World War II
Wisconsin sheriffs